UFC Fight Night: Silva vs. Irvin (also known as UFC Fight Night 14) was a mixed martial arts event held by the Ultimate Fighting Championship (UFC) on July 19, 2008, at the Palms Casino Resort in Las Vegas, Nevada.

Background
The main event marked Anderson "The Spider" Silva's first foray into the Light Heavyweight division, facing James "The Sandman" Irvin. After the fight, Irvin tested positive for methadone and oxymorphone.

This card was put together on an unusually short notice, it was an attempt to compete with rival promotion Affliction's PPV premiere.

The bout between Anthony Johnson and Kevin Burns ended in controversy.  Referee Steve Mazzagatti awarded Burns the victory after Johnson fell to the ground following an eyepoke, despite the fact that Mazzagatti warned Burns several times during the fight about fouls. Johnson appealed the decision to the NSAC, but it was ultimately rejected.

The event was broadcast in the U.S. and Canada on Spike, and in the UK on Setanta Sports 2.

Results

Bonus awards
At the end of the night, the UFC awarded $25,000 to each of the fighters who received one of these three awards.
Fight of the Night: Hermes Franca vs. Frankie Edgar
Knockout of the Night: Rory Markham
Submission of the Night: CB Dollaway

See also
 Ultimate Fighting Championship
 List of UFC champions
 List of UFC events
 2008 in UFC

References

External links
 Official card

UFC Fight Night
2008 in mixed martial arts
Mixed martial arts in Las Vegas
2008 in sports in Nevada
Palms Casino Resort